Andrea De Marchi may refer to:
 Andrea De Marchi (rugby union, born 1988)
Andrea De Marchi (rugby union, born 1992)